Charles Alvin Kekumano (1919–1998) was a Roman Catholic priest from Hawaii. He is considered the first ordained Native Hawaiian priest.

Life
Charles Kekumano was born in 1919 in Kona on the island of Hawai‘i.  Educated at Saint Louis High School in Honolulu, he studied for the priesthood and was ordained for the Diocese of Honolulu.  He earned a doctorate in Canon law from The Catholic University of America in Washington, D.C. and was  appointed chancellor of the Honolulu diocese, secretary to Bishop James Joseph Sweeney, and later rector of the Cathedral of Our Lady of Peace.  In 1961 he was named an honorary chaplain of the Papal household, with the title of Monsignor, by Blessed John XXIII, the first native Hawaiian to hold such an honor.

Shortly after Father Joseph Anthony Ferrario became bishop, Kekumano left the diocese of Honolulu, to work in the diocese of Juneau. He retired in 1984 and returned to Honolulu.  Kekumano was involved in many civic organizations, including the American Red Cross, the Duke Kahanamoku Foundation, the Association of Hawaiian Civic Clubs, the Hawaiian Civic Club of Honolulu.  He also served on the University of Hawaii Board of Regents, the Honolulu Police Commission, the Maui Charter Commission, and the Hawaii Commission on Children and Youth. Kekumano was also a trustee of the Queen Liliuokalani Trust from 1986-1998.  He was president of the 200 Club, Coalition for a Drug Free Hawaii and the Hawaii chapter of the United Service Organization. 
 
In 1997 he was co-author of the essay "Broken Trust" which  criticized Kamehameha Schools, the largest private landowner in Hawaii, resulting in their reorganization.
He died of cancer on January 18, 1998 in St. Francis Hospice in Honolulu, at the age of 78.

Recognition and legacy 
1992: Humanitarian of the Year award from the Hawaii State Chapter of the American Red Cross. 

The Maryknoll School established an award and scholarship in his honor.

References

1919 births
1998 deaths
20th-century American Roman Catholic priests
Hawaii Catholic priests
Catholic University of America alumni
Native Hawaiian people